Oti Uttam is a 2023 Bengali romantic comedy film directed by Srijit Mukherji and produced by Camellia Productions and Matchcut Productions. Bengali actor Uttam Kumar appears in the screen through Visual effects from his existing clippings from his various films.<ref>{{Cite web|title=Srijit Mukherji shares poster for Oti Uttam on Uttam Kumars 95th birth anniversary|url=https://www.outlookindia.com/newsscroll/srijit-mukherji-shares-poster-for-oti-uttam-on-uttam-kumars-95th-birth-anniversary/2153310|access-date=2021-09-08|website=Outlook (India)}}</ref> His character was built by the scenes of his 56 existing old movies.

Plot
A Ph.D. researcher working on a project on Mahanayak'' Uttam Kumar. He likes a girl but gets refused every times. The researcher decides to bring his icon Uttam Kumar's spirit through planchette. Mahanayak's grandson helps him in to fulfill the love life of researcher.

Cast
 Gourab Chatterjee as himself
 Laboni Sarkar
 Subhasish Mukherjee
 Anindya Sengupta
 Roshni Bhattacharyya
 VJ Jina

Release 
The film will theatrically release in 2023

References

Bengali-language Indian films
Indian romantic comedy films
Films directed by Srijit Mukherji
2022 films